The 2009 America East men's lacrosse tournament was the 10th edition of the America East Conference men's lacrosse tournament and took place from April 29 to May 2 at the higher seeds home field. The winner of the tournament received the America East Conference's automatic bid to the 2009 NCAA Division I Men's Lacrosse Championship. Four teams from the America East conference will compete in the single elimination tournament. The seeds were based upon the teams' regular season conference record.

Standings
Only the top four teams in the America East conference advanced to the America East Conference Tournament.

Schedule

Bracket

 denotes an overtime game

All-Tournament

Brian Caufield, Albany

Corey Small, Albany

Larry Kline, Binghamton

Chris Mulheron, Binghamton

Kevin Crowley, Stony Brook

Chris Gignilliat, Stony Brook

Steve Waldeck, Stony Brook

Jeremy Blevins, UMBC

Mike Camardo, UMBC

Justin Radebaugh, UMBC

Ryan Smith, UMBC

Most Outstanding Player

Mike Camardo, UMBC

References 

2009 in lacrosse